Russula lutea is a common, edible species of mushroom in the genus Russula found throughout the Americas and Europe under broad-leaved trees from summer to early autumn.

Description 

The cap is 2–7 cm across, convex, flattening on the edges and creating a saucer-shaped depression. The cap is usually golden or yellow, but sometimes is apricot, peach, or coral colored either partly or entirely. It is thin-fleshed and rather fragile. The stem is 20–60 x 5–15 mm, white and cylindrical, and is soft and fragile. The flesh is white with a mild taste. There is no smell when young, later the smell is fruity. The gills are deep saffron color and strongly interlined. The spore print is ochre. The spores are ovoid-elliptic with warts up to 1 micrometre high.

See also 
 List of Russula species

References 

lutea
Edible fungi
Fungi of Europe